Under the Force of Courage is the tenth studio album by power metal/neo-classical metal band Galneryus. It is their last album to feature original drummer Jun-ichi.

Track listing
All songs arranged by Galneryus and Yorimasa Hisatake.

Track 8 was rerecorded in Syu's 2016 solo album You Play Hard as an instrumental

Personnel
Syu - Guitar
Sho - Vocals
Taka - Bass
Junichi - Drums
Yuhki - Keyboards, Hammond organ

References

External links
 Official movie

2015 albums
Galneryus albums
Neoclassicism